In calculus and mathematical analysis the limits of integration (or bounds of integration) of the integral

For example, the function  is defined on the interval 

Integration by Substitution (U-Substitution) 
In Integration by substitution, the limits of integration will change due to the new function being integrated. In general,

For example,

The same applies for other substitutions.

Improper integrals

Limits of integration can also be defined for improper integrals, with the limits of integration of both

and

again being a and b. For an improper integral

or

the limits of integration are a and ∞, or −∞ and b, respectively.

Definite Integrals 
If , then

.

See also

 Integral
 Riemann integration
Definite integral

References 

Integral calculus
Real analysis